Qaraghil (also Romanized as Qarāghīl) is a village in Teymurlu Rural District of Gugan District, Azarshahr County, East Azerbaijan province, Iran. At the 2006 census, its population was 1,527 in 332 households. The following census in 2011 counted 1,638 people in 482 households. The latest census in 2016 showed a population of 1,723 people in 478 households; it was the largest village in its rural district.

References 

Azarshahr County

Populated places in East Azerbaijan Province

Populated places in Azarshahr County